is a former Japanese Nippon Professional Baseball player.

References 

1967 births
Living people
People from Tateyama, Chiba
Baseball players at the 1988 Summer Olympics
Olympic baseball players of Japan
Olympic silver medalists for Japan
Nippon Professional Baseball infielders
Orix Braves players
Orix BlueWave players
Yokohama BayStars players
Japanese baseball coaches
Nippon Professional Baseball coaches
Medalists at the 1988 Summer Olympics
Baseball people from Chiba Prefecture